"I Wanna Feel That Way Again" is a song written by Danni Leigh, Jeff Stevens and Steve Bogard, and recorded by American country music artist Tracy Byrd.  It was released in June 1998 as the second and final single from the album I'm from the Country.  The song reached number 9 on the Billboard Hot Country Singles & Tracks chart.

Chart performance
"I Wanna Feel That Way Again" debuted at number 75 on the U.S. Billboard Hot Country Singles & Tracks for the week of June 20, 1998.

Year-end charts

References

1998 singles
1998 songs
Tracy Byrd songs
Songs written by Jeff Stevens (singer)
Song recordings produced by Tony Brown (record producer)
MCA Nashville Records singles
Songs written by Steve Bogard